Volker Kutscher (born December 26, 1962) is a German novelist, best known for his Berlin-based Gereon Rath crime series, which serves as the basis for the Sky thriller series Babylon Berlin.

Biography 
Kutscher was born on December 26, 1962, in Lindlar, North Rhine-Westphalia outside of Cologne, Germany. At university, Kutscher studied German, philosophy and history, and later worked as a newspaper editor prior to beginning his career as a novelist.

In 1996, Kutscher published his first crime novel Bullenmord, set in his native region Bergisches Land. He followed this with two other standalone books, published in 1998 and 2003, respectively.

Kutscher works as a full-time author and lives in Cologne.

Gereon Rath series 
Inspired by his historical knowledge as well as The Sopranos, the 2002 gangster film Road to Perdition (set in 1931), and Fritz Lang's 1931 Berlin-based film M, Kutscher began working on the Gereon Rath series in the early 2000s. Set in the Weimar Republic, the series are meticulously researched and confront fictional as well as non-fictional characters. Of note, Kutscher's works are the first German crime novels set in the "golden" 1920s. The series was an instant hit in Germany and was awarded the Berlin Krimi-Fuchs Crime Writers Prize in 2011 and has sold over one million copies worldwide.

His award-winning Gereon Rath series, published by Kiepenheuer & Witsch, consists of nine novels, set one per year, beginning with Der nasse Fisch (2008), set in 1929. Der stumme Tod (2009) is set in 1930, Goldstein (2010) is set in 1931, Die Akte Vaterland (2012) is set in 1932, Märzgefallene (2014) is set in 1933, Lunapark (2016) is set in 1934. In 2017, Kutscher published Moabit (a short story set before the first Rath novel and portraying his partner Charlie's entrance to the world of criminal investigation) and in 2018 the novel Marlow, set in 1935. The eighth installment, Olympia, set in 1936, was released in Germany on November 2, 2020. The ninth installment, Transatlantik, set in 1937, was published in Germany on October 27, 2022. The first five books in the series have been published in English by Sandstone Press, translated by Niall Sellar.

Television adaption 
In the mid-2010s, a writer-director team of Tom Tykwer, Achim von Borries and Hendrik Handloegten used Kutscher's novels as the basis for the show Babylon Berlin. The series premiered on October 13, 2017, on Sky 1, a German-language entertainment channel broadcast by Sky Deutschland. Netflix has released the first three seasons in the US, Canada, and Australia.

Seasons 1 and 2 are based loosely on the first book in the series. While the book shows mostly what Rath sees, the show shows the actual smuggled train, and many other differences. Season 3 draws material from Book 2, notably the plot line of an actress killed by a falling light, but has many other differences. Season 4 differs strongly in the portrayal of the visiting American gangster Goldstein.

The show has received many accolades and has brought Kutscher's books to an international audience. The show has received many awards including a Bambi in the category Beste Serie des Jahres (Best series of the year), four awards at the Deutscher Fernsehpreis, a Grimme-Preis, a Goldene Kamera for lead actor Volker Bruch. In December 2019, the European Film Academy awarded the series with the inaugural Achievement in Fiction Series Award at the European Film Awards.

Bibliography

Novels 

Gereon Rath series:
 Der nasse Fisch, Kiepenheuer & Witsch, Cologne 2008, .
 English translation: Babylon Berlin, Sandstone Press, Dingwall 2016, translated by Niall Sellar
 Der stumme Tod, Kiepenheuer & Witsch, Cologne 2009, .
 English translation: The Silent Death, Sandstone Press, Dingwall 2017, translated by Niall Sellar
 Goldstein, Kiepenheuer & Witsch, Cologne 2010, .
 English translation: Goldstein, Sandstone Press, Dingwall 2018, translated by Niall Sellar
 Die Akte Vaterland, Kiepenheuer & Witsch, Cologne 2012, .
 English translation: The Fatherland Files, Sandstone Press, Highland 2019, translated by Niall Sellar
 Märzgefallene, Kiepenheuer & Witsch, Cologne 2014, .
 English translation: The March Fallen, Sandstone Press, Highland 2020, translated by Niall Sellar
 "Märchen mit Zündhölzern", Kiepenheuer & Witsch, Cologne 2016, short story, eBook exclusive
 "Durchmarsch", Kiepenheuer & Witsch, Cologne 2016, short story, eBook exclusive
 Lunapark, Kiepenheuer & Witsch, Cologne 2016, .
 "Plan B", Kiepenheuer & Witsch, Cologne 2016, short story, eBook exclusive
 "Moabit", short story, prequel, Galiani, Berlin/Cologne 2017, .
 Marlow, Piper, Munich 2018, .
 Olympia, Piper, Munich 2020, .
 "Mitte", short story, Galiani, Berlin/Cologne 2021, .
 Transatlantik, Piper, Munich, 2022, .

Standalone:
 Bullenmord, Emons Verlag, Cologne 1995, with Christian Schnalke
 Vater unser, Emons Verlag, Cologne 1998, with Christian Schnalke
 Der schwarze Jakobiner, Emons Verlag, Cologne 2003,

Comics 

 Der nasse Fisch, Carlsen, Hamburg 2017, with Arne Jysch, adaptation of his homonymous novel

Scripts 

 Ladylike – Jetzt erst recht! (2009), TV movie
 "Rot wie der Tod" (2010), episode of series Einsatz in Hamburg (2000-2013)
 Babylon Berlin (2017-), series

Adaptations 

 Babylon Berlin (2017-), series directed by Tom Tykwer, Achim von Borries and Hendrik Handloegten, based on Gereon Rath series

References

External links
 
 
 Historical maps on which the locations of the Gereon Rath series are marked and provided with background information and pictures

1962 births
Living people
20th-century German novelists
21st-century German novelists
Mystery writers
German crime fiction writers